Densinkran is the hairstyle worn by queen mothers and women of the Ashanti people in Ghana. It is a short cut and the edges of the head and hair are dyed with charcoal or black dye.

History 

The Asantes were defeated by an alliance of the British with Ga-Adangbe, Fanti, Denkyira, Akwamu and Akyems at Katamanso.  The Densinkran was introduced to mourn the Asante dead in the Katamanso.The name dubbed "Gyese Nkran" (except Akra) in local parlance vulgarized as Densinkran.

The only other women who wear this cut are elderly women and who are part of the royal family.The hair in African culture is very emotive and symbolic to identity.

Significance 
It serves as hairstyle for royal identity

A funeral hairstyle 

It communicates one status, rank and ethnic identity in a community

References 

History of Ghana
Culture of the Ashanti Empire